Gino Stacchini (born 18 February 1938) is a retired Italian professional footballer who played as a forward or midfielder.

Honours
Juventus
 Serie A champion: 1957–58, 1959–60, 1960–61, 1966–67.
 Coppa Italia winner: 1958–59, 1959–60, 1964–65.

External links
 

1938 births
Living people
Italian footballers
Italy international footballers
Serie A players
Serie B players
Juventus F.C. players
Mantova 1911 players
A.C. Cesena players
Association football midfielders
Association football forwards